Dowding may refer to:

Dowding (surname)
Baron Dowding, British peerage created in 1943 for ACM Hugh Dowding (1882–1970)
Dowding Ministry, ministry of the Government of Western Australia 1988–1990 under Peter Dowding